Remio Best is the first compilation album by Japanese band Remioromen, also their first on Oorong Records. It was released March 9, 2009, and debuted #1 on Japanese Oricon Album Weekly Chart, selling 280,599 copies in its first week, becoming their second #1 album on this chart following Horizon.

Track listing

Chart positions
Oricon Sales Chart (Japan)

References
Oricon Style
Remioromen's official website

Remioromen albums
2009 greatest hits albums
Avex Group albums